Aleksandr Dekhayev (born 16 October 1924) is a Soviet modern pentathlete. He competed at the 1952 Summer Olympics.

References

External links
 
 

1924 births
Possibly living people
Soviet male modern pentathletes
Olympic modern pentathletes of the Soviet Union
Modern pentathletes at the 1952 Summer Olympics